Velachery is a residential area in southern Chennai

Velachery may also refer to:

 Velachery railway station
 Velachery (state assembly constituency)
 Velachery Lake
 Velachery taluk
 Velachery twin flyovers